Pearse Daniel Doherty (born 6 July 1977) is an Irish Sinn Féin politician who has been a Teachta Dála (TD) for the Donegal constituency since the 2016 general election, and previously a TD for the Donegal South-West constituency from 2010 to 2016. He also previously served as a Senator for the Agricultural Panel from 2007 to 2010.

Early life
Pearse Daniel Doherty was born in Glasgow on 6 July 1977, the son of Irish parents. When he was three years old, the family returned home to the Irish-speaking town of Gweedore, where he grew up and became fluent in Irish. He enrolled in a civil engineering degree course at Dublin Institute of Technology in 1996. In 1999, Doherty and three other Sinn Féin activists were arrested in Dublin. At a court hearing, it was revealed that Doherty had abused a Garda. He was convicted, but avoided getting a criminal record.

He completed two years of the course, earning a national certificate that entitled him to work as a civil engineering technician. He then left third-level education to pursue a job in that field. He later resumed his studies by enrolling in another civil engineering course at Letterkenny Institute of Technology, but dropped out in order to run for Dáil Éireann in the 2002 general election.

Political career
A member of Sinn Féin since 1996, Doherty was a founding member of Sinn Féin Republican Youth and served on its national executive.

In the 2002 general election, Doherty ran unsuccessfully in the Donegal South-West constituency. On 11 June 2004, he ran simultaneously in the local elections for Donegal County Council and in the 2004 European Parliament elections. He failed to win a seat in the European Parliament, but was elected to serve as a member of Donegal County Council for the Glenties local electoral area.

Doherty's second attempt to win a Dáil seat, at the 2007 general election, also proved unsuccessful; he received 21.2% of the first-preference vote. However, he was elected to Seanad Éireann as a Senator for the Agricultural Panel on 24 July 2007.

On 12 July 2010, the High Court granted Doherty a judicial review into why the government had not held a by-election to fill the Dáil seat vacated by Fianna Fáil's Pat "the Cope" Gallagher when he won election to the European Parliament in June 2009. On 2 November 2010, the High Court ruled that the government had delayed unreasonably in holding the by-election. In response to the ruling, the government announced that the Donegal South-West by-election would be held on 25 November 2010. Doherty stood as the Sinn Féin candidate and won the by-election by a substantial margin, earning 39.8 percent of the first-preference vote. On taking his seat in the Dáil, Doherty was appointed Sinn Féin's spokesperson on Finance. However, the Dáil was dissolved on 1 February 2011, at which point Doherty had been a TD for just over nine weeks.

Shortly before the 2011 general election, several newspapers alleged that Doherty had misled the public by stating on various Sinn Féin and Oireachtas webpages that he had formerly worked as a "civil engineer", an occupation that presumes a degree-level qualification. Doherty insisted that he had "always been upfront" about the fact that he had not completed his degree, clarified his educational credentials, and acknowledged that he had qualified as a civil engineering technician and not a civil engineer.

In that election Doherty topped the poll decisively in Donegal South-West, attaining 33.0% of the first-preference vote.

Doherty represented Sinn Féin in the Oireachtas delegation that met the Bundestag's Budgetary and European Affairs committees in Berlin in late January 2012.

It was revealed in June 2012, that Doherty put €8,000 worth of unspent travel and accommodation expenses towards hiring part-time party workers, despite these expenses being supposed to be returned to the Oireachtas under rules introduced in 2010. A report found that he had not breached any expense rules, and cleared him of any wrongdoing.

At the 2016 general election, after a redrawing of constituency boundaries, Doherty was elected to the new five-seater Donegal constituency on the 8th count.

He topped the poll at the 2020 general election, and was appointed leader of Sinn Féin's negotiations team.

On 16 June 2022, Doherty clashed with Tánaiste Leo Varadkar in the Dáil. Doherty attacked Varadkar for being "out of touch" and brought up Varadkar's legal issues with the DPP. Varadkar responded by calling it a "cheap shot" and brought up a 1999 in which Doherty was convicted of abusing a Garda, saying "You abused, mistreated a Garda Síochána. For that you were prosecuted. You were found guilty. Yes, you got away without a conviction because of your age at the time, but you were actually prosecuted. You were arrested. That's what happened to you."

Personal life
Doherty continues to reside in Gweedore. He is married to Róisín, a school teacher from County Monaghan. They have four sons.

References

External links

 Pearse Doherty's page on the Sinn Féin website
 Pearse Doherty donegalsf.com
 Dáil General Election Profile : Pearse Doherty, Donegal South–West

1977 births
Living people
Members of the 23rd Seanad
Members of the 30th Dáil
Members of the 31st Dáil
Members of the 32nd Dáil
Members of the 33rd Dáil
People from Gweedore
Politicians from County Donegal
Sinn Féin TDs (post-1923)
Sinn Féin senators